Qiao Yunping (Chinese: 乔云萍; born 13 September 1968) is a Chinese international table tennis player.

Table tennis career
She won a silver medal in 1996 Atlanta Olympics Games in women's doubles.

Her six World Championship medals included two gold medals; one in the doubles with Liu Wei at the 1993 World Table Tennis Championships and one in the team event at the 1995 World Table Tennis Championships.

See also
 List of table tennis players
 List of World Table Tennis Championships medalists

References

External links
 
 

1968 births
Living people
Chinese female table tennis players
Olympic medalists in table tennis
Asian Games medalists in table tennis
Table tennis players at the 1994 Asian Games
Table tennis players from Qingdao
Olympic table tennis players of China
Asian Games gold medalists for China
Medalists at the 1994 Asian Games
World Table Tennis Championships medalists
Olympic silver medalists for China
Table tennis players at the 1996 Summer Olympics
Medalists at the 1996 Summer Olympics